Massilia putida is a Gram-negative and motile bacterium from the genus Massilia with a single polar flagellum, which has been isolated from a wolfram mine in Dayu County in the Jiangxi Province in China. Massilia putida has the ability to produce dimethyl disulfide.

References

Further reading

External links
Type strain of Massilia putida at BacDive -  the Bacterial Diversity Metadatabase

Burkholderiales
Bacteria described in 2016